1st Guards Brigade may refer to:

German
 1st Guards Cavalry Brigade (German Empire)
 1st Guards Artillery Brigade (German Empire)
 1st Guards Infantry Brigade (German Empire)

Others
 1st Guards Brigade (Croatia)
 1st Guards Infantry Brigade (Imperial Japanese Army)
 1st Guards Armoured Brigade (Ukraine)
 1st (Guards) Brigade designation for the British 1st Infantry Brigade at the outbreak of World War I and World War II
 1st Guards Brigade (United Kingdom)